The 1806 Vermont gubernatorial election for Governor of Vermont took place throughout September, and resulted in the re-election of Isaac Tichenor to a one-year term.

The Vermont General Assembly met in Middlebury on October 9. The Vermont House of Representatives appointed a committee to examine the votes of the freemen of Vermont for governor, lieutenant governor, treasurer, and members of the governor's council.

The committee's examination of the votes showed that Governor Isaac Tichenor was chosen for a tenth one-year term. In the election for lieutenant governor, the voters selected Paul Brigham for an eleventh one-year term. Benjamin Swan was elected to his seventh one-year term as treasurer.

In the races for lieutenant governor and treasurer, the vote totals and names of other candidates were not recorded. According to a contemporary newspaper report, the vote totals for governor were as follows.

Results

References

Vermont gubernatorial elections
gubernatorial
Vermont